In Nomine Satanas is the fourth album by Norwegian black metal band Ragnarok, released on January 21, 2002.

Track listing
All music written by Ragnarok.
All lyrics written by Ragnarok, except "A Nights Kingdom" and "Under The Wings Of Satan", written by Lillith Demona.

Personnel

Ragnarok
 Lord Arcamous - vocals, guitar
 Rym - guitar
 Jerv - bass guitar
 Jontho - drums

References

2002 albums
Ragnarok (Norwegian band) albums
Regain Records albums